Jerraud Powers  (born July 19, 1987) is a former American football cornerback. He played college football at Auburn and was drafted by the Indianapolis Colts in the third round of the 2009 NFL Draft. He also played for the Arizona Cardinals and Baltimore Ravens.

Early years
Powers attended Decatur High School and was an all-state player
He was named All-Region his senior year and was rated as a 3-Star prospect and the #13 player in the state of Alabama by scout.com. Rivals.com rated Powers the #8 player in Alabama following his senior season.

College career

2006 season
Powers broke his foot during preseason workouts and it appeared at the time that he would have only a small chance to get on the field, but he was able to play. Powers earned playing time on special teams as a freshman.  Powers recovered a critical onside kick in Auburn's 24-17 win over South Carolina. Powers also made a name for himself by blocking Eric Wilbur's third quarter punt in a home game against the eventual national champion Florida Gators. As a sophomore, Powers earned a starting spot at cornerback and played the entire season. He was selected to the Southeastern Conference All-Freshman Team on a pass defense that rated second in the SEC this season.

2007 season
Powers had a very successful 2007 season and received the Zeke Smith Award, presented each year to Auburn's Defensive Player of the Year. Jerraud Powers is also remembered as the cornerback covering LSU receiver Demetrius Byrd on his one-handed touchdown grab with one second remaining in the 2007 Auburn-LSU game. Powers also received a lot of attention from ESPN when an Auburn police dog bit his hand after a play in the 2007 Iron Bowl. The incident prompted a review of security procedures at Auburn.

2008 season
Powers returned for his junior season with high expectations after an impressive sophomore season. His matchup against Florida's wing right Percy Harvin was considered a key to the big game. Powers was impressive early in the season, leading Auburn to a shutout in the season opener. However, Powers played with an injured hamstring and struggled through much of the season. Powers was just one of many injured players on Auburn's 2008 football team, Auburn finished with a disappointing 5-7 record and missed the postseason for the first time this decade. After the season, Powers decided to forgo his senior season at Auburn and enter the 2009 NFL Draft.

Professional career
Powers was projected to be a possible NFL draft pick. Powers was rated 14 out of 239 cornerbacks and 110 out of 2,497 total players evaluated.

Indianapolis Colts

Despite being considered a prospect for a lower round, Jerraud was drafted by the Indianapolis Colts in the third round.  He signed with the Colts on July 28, 2009, for a 4-year contract.

Powers began the 2009 season as a starter due to injuries to Marlin Jackson, and went on to start 12 of 16 games for the Colts. Despite injuries to three of the Colts' projected Defensive Backfield starters, Powers (along with fellow rookie Jacob Lacey) played well enough to put the Colts' pass defense at third in the league in Yards/Attempt. Powers recorded 66 tackles and an interception. On December 7, 2010, he was placed on season-ending injury reserve due to an arm injury.

In 2010, Powers played in 10 games, starting all of them. Powers had 53 tackles and 2 interceptions. On November 6, 2011, Powers had a pick six against Matt Ryan of the Atlanta Falcons. This was his first career touchdown. The Colts lost the game 31-7.

Arizona Cardinals
On March 13, 2013, the Arizona Cardinals signed Powers to a three-year contract, reuniting him with head coach Bruce Arians who was his interim head coach the previous year with the Indianapolis Colts.

Baltimore Ravens
On May 13, 2016, Powers signed with the Ravens on a one-year, $1.75 million contract.

Retirement
On April 14, 2017, Powers announced his retirement from the NFL after eight seasons.

References

External links
Official website
Indianapolis Colts bio
Auburn Tigers bio 

1987 births
Living people
Sportspeople from Decatur, Alabama
Players of American football from Alabama
American football cornerbacks
Auburn Tigers football players
Indianapolis Colts players
Arizona Cardinals players
Baltimore Ravens players